The New Zealand Rugby League (NZRL) is the governing body for the sport of rugby league football in New Zealand. The NZRL was founded on 25 April 1910 in preparation for a tour of Great Britain that same year.

The NZRL administers the New Zealand Kiwis and the New Zealand Kiwi Ferns. Currently they manage the NZRL National Secondary Schools Tournament, the NZRL Women's National Tournament and the NZRL National 20's Competition, a seven Zone national competition played at 16s, 18s grades. The premier competition is known as the National Premiership and the National Championship which is a tier below. NZRL launched the Inaugural National 20's Competition in 2021 as a new pathway for developing elite talent, this includes 2 teams from Auckland, Auckland Blue and Auckland White, Wai-Coa Bay, Central Districts, Northland and South Island. They are also responsible for elite pathway programmes including the NZ 16s and NZ 18s teams, the NZ Taurahere and the Junior Kiwis.  They have previously managed the now defunct Lion Red Cup and Bartercard Cup competitions.

The NZRL is an incorporated society under the Incorporated Societies Act 1908. The current patron of the NZRL is Sir Anand Satyanand , who replaced Sir Peter Leitch in the role in 2019.

History

In April 1910, the New Zealand Rugby League was formed for the purpose of administering the new code in New Zealand  and "with the blessing of the Northern Rugby Football Union, on the condition that the Auckland District would not have the management of the entire game in New Zealand".

Staff

Board
 Reon Edwards (Chairman)
 Andrew Fraser 
 Paula Kearns
 Hugh Martyn
 Tawera Nikau
 Grant Stapleton
 Natasha Tere

Staff
CEO: Greg Peters
President: Howie Tamati

National Competition 

The National Competition (previously called the National Zonal Competition) is the top-level rugby league competition run by the New Zealand Rugby League. In 2010 the competition replaced the Bartercard Premiership following a Sparc funded review and restructure of the New Zealand Rugby League. Since 2019, the competition has consisted of a four-team national premiership and an eight-team national championship (split into North and South Island Conferences) with a promotion and relegation between the two divisions.

Zones

Throughout New Zealand, the sport is administered by seven zones and fifteen districts and has seven Affiliates.

Zones
 Rugby League Northland (Northern Swords)
 Akarana (Akarana Falcons)
Counties Manukau (Counties Manukau Stingrays)
Upper Central (Wai-Coa-Bay Stallions)
Mid Central (Central Vipers)
Wellington (Wellington Orcas)
Southern (Canterbury Bulls)

Districts
 Auckland Rugby League
 Aoraki Rugby League
 Bay of Plenty Rugby League
 Canterbury Rugby League
 Coastline Rugby League
 Gisborne Tairawhiti Rugby League
 Manawatu Rugby League
 Otago Rugby League
 Southland Rugby League
 Rugby League Hawke's Bay
 Taranaki Rugby League
 Tasman Rugby League
 Waikato Rugby League
 Wellington Rugby League
 West Coast Rugby League
 Whangarei City & Districts

Affiliates
 Kiwis Association
 Masters of Rugby League
 Defence Forces
 Māori Rugby League
 Universities and Tertiary Students
 Women's Rugby League
 Pacific Island Rugby League

Legends of League
47 players have been inducted since the Legends of League was introduced in 1995. 

1995 Inductees
Ron Ackland
Bert Avery
Roger Bailey
Tom Baxter
Mel Cooke
Cyril Eastlake
Mark Graham
Cliff Johnson
Hugh McGahan
George Menzies
John Percival
Kevin Tamati
Des White
Dennis Williams

2000 Inductees
Dean Bell
Lory Blanchard
Travers Hardwick
Karl Ifwersen
Charlie McBride
Bill McLennan
Cecil Mountford
Maurie Robertson
Bill Sorensen
Kurt Sorensen

2001 Inductees
Albert Baskerville
Jock Butterfield
Phillip Orchard
Charlie Seeling

2007 Inductees
Roy Christian
Tony Coll
Olsen Filipaina
Gary Freeman
Scotty McClymont
Ron McGregor
Frank Mulcare
Pat Smith
Ken Stirling
Lance Todd

2008 Inductees
Albert Asher
Tawera Nikau
Jim Rukutai
Puti Tipene (Steve) Watene
2010 Inductees
Don Hammond
Tom Hadfield

2012 Inductees (Wellington centenary)
Stephen Kearney
Colin O'Neil
John Whittaker
2013 Inductees (Canterbury centenary)
Jimmy Haig
Alister Atkinson
Mocky Brereton
Mark Broadhurst

See also

 Rugby League in New Zealand
 New Zealand national rugby league team
 Bartercard Cup

References

External links
 Official site
 

 
Rugby League
Sports organizations established in 1910